Lincon Muteta,(born 18 January 1975) is a Zimbabwean sculptor.

Life
Muteta was born in 1975 in the Highfield area of Harare, the youngest of four children in a family originally from Mutoko. He began sculpting in 1989 while in secondary school in Harare, later becoming an assistant to Danny Kanyemba. He was encouraged to start work on his own as a full-time sculptor by Moses Masaya.

Muteta was a resident artist at the Chapungu Sculpture Park in 1996–97. During 2004–08, he travelled and exhibited in group exhibitions in South Africa, Bahrain, Dubai, England, and Canada with Zimsculpt. His works have also been exhibited in Spain, Germany, Holland, the United States, Switzerland, Ireland, Belgium and Italy.

He is married with two daughters.

References

External links 
Biographical sketch

1975 births
Living people
20th-century Zimbabwean sculptors
21st-century Zimbabwean sculptors